Charas is a form of cannabis.

Charas may also refer to:

 Charas (1976 film), a 1976 Bollywood film starring Dharmendra and Hema Malini
 Charas (2004 film), a 2004 Bollywood film starring Uday Chopra, Jimmy Sheirgill, Irrfan Khan and Hrishitaa Bhatt
 Charas/El Bohio, a former community center in New York City
 Macabeo also known as Charas Blanc

See also

 Chara (disambiguation)
Charls